Aretha Arrives is the eleventh studio album by American singer Aretha Franklin, released on August 4, 1967, by Atlantic Records. Its first single release was "Baby I Love You", a million-selling Gold 45 which hit #1 R&B and #4 on the Billboard Hot 100, followed by her cover version of The Rolling Stones' "(I Can't Get No) Satisfaction" in 1968. This was her second album for Atlantic. The sessions for the album were delayed because Franklin shattered her elbow in an accident during a Southern tour. She decided she was ready to record before her doctor thought she was ready. While she still did not have full mobility, she provided piano accompaniment on the slower songs and played with her left hand only on "You Are My Sunshine".

Reception
After its release, Rolling Stone stated: "...neither the sophistication nor the subtlety of the musicians involved gets in the way of the basic primitivism of Aretha's music. The best cuts on the record hit with tremendous immediacy and force, and do so in an entirely artistic way. The only hang-ups are the occasional reliance on unnecessary gimmicks, and the weakness of some of the material."

In 2004, Q ranked the album at number 1 in its list of "20 Forgettable Follow-Ups to Big Albums".

Track listing

Personnel
Aretha Franklin – vocals, piano
Jimmy Johnson, Joe South – guitar
Tommy Cogbill – bass guitar
Roger Hawkins – drums
Teddy Sommer – vibraphone
Spooner Oldham, Truman Thomas – piano, organ, electric piano
Charles Chalmers, King Curtis – tenor saxophone
Tony Studd – bass trombone
Melvin Lastie – trumpet
Gene Orloff – director of string section
The Sweet Inspirations – background vocals on "Ain't Nobody"
Aretha, Carolyn and Erma Franklin – background vocals on "You Are My Sunshine", "96 Tears", "That's Life" and "Baby I Love You"
Ralph Burns - string and French horn arrangements
Arif Mardin, Tom Dowd - recording engineer, arrangements

See also
List of number-one R&B albums of 1967 (U.S.)

References
Tracks and Personnel are from the LP liner notes.

1967 albums
Aretha Franklin albums
Albums produced by Jerry Wexler
Atlantic Records albums
Rhino Records albums